MTV is a Brazilian pay television channel owned by Paramount Networks Americas. The channel is the second Brazilian version of MTV after the free-to-air network MTV Brasil, founded in 1990, ended its operations. The channel premiered at 9:30 pm BRT of 1 October 2013, with the TV show Coletivation.

Programming

Original programming
 Acústico MTV – television series showcasing musical artists based on the original American format MTV Unplugged.
 Adotada.
 Catfish Brasil – reality television based on the original American format Catfish: The TV Show.
 De Férias com o Ex – reality television based on the original British format Ex on the Beach.
 Drag Race Brasil – reality television based on the original American format RuPaul's Drag Race.
 MTV Hits – two-hour program which plays only chart hits.
 Rio Shore – reality television based on the original American format Jersey Shore.

Acquired programming
From MTV USA and MTV2 USA:
 Are You the One?
 Catfish: The TV Show
 Ex on the Beach
 Fear Factor
 Floribama Shore
 Jersey Shore: Family Vacation
 MTV Unplugged
 Siesta Key
 Teen Mom
 Teen Mom 2

From MTV International:
 Acapulco Shore
 Ex on the Beach
 Geordie Shore
 Just Tattoo of Us
 MTV World Stage
 Super Shore
 The Charlotte Show
 The Royal World
 True Love or True Lies?

From other Viacom Media Networks properties:
 South Park (from Comedy Central)

Award shows:
 MTV Millennial Awards Brazil
 MTV Europe Music Award
 MTV Movie & TV Awards
 MTV Video Music Award

Hosts

Current hosts
 Caio Castro (2018 - present)
 Ciro Sales (2016 - present)
 Hugo Gloss (2016 - present)
 Maria Eugênia Suconic (2013 - present)
 Michelli Provensi (2015 - present)
 Ricardo Gadelha (2016 - present)

Former hosts
 Cauê Moura (2017)
 Ana Flávia Bastos (2015)
 Deco Neves (2014)
 Eléa Mercurio (2014)
 Ellen Milgrau (2016 - 2017)
 Felipe Titto (2015 - 2017)
 Fiuk (2013)
 José Trassi (2015)
 Kéfera Buchmann (2014)
 Laurent F (2015)
 Lucas Stegmann (2014)
 Luitha Miraglia (2015 - 2016)
 Mayara Lepre (2013 - 2014)
 Patrick Maia (2013 - 2014)
 Paulo Chun (2013 - 2015)
 Primo Preto (2015)
 Supla (2013 - 2015)
 Talita Alves (2013 - 2014)

References

External links
 
 Ask Mama MTV (used as a "preview" for the relaunched MTV)

MTV channels
Television channels and stations established in 2013